Godwin Adeyi Robinson is the Anglican Bishop of Lafia in Abuja Province  of the Church of Nigeria.

He took office as Bishop in 2017, taking over from Miller Maza.

References 

Living people
Anglican bishops of Lafia
21st-century Anglican bishops in Nigeria
Nigerian Anglicans
Year of birth missing (living people)